Leopoldism is a collective name for political movements who were loyal to Leopold III of Belgium during the Royal question.

Organisations 
 Verdinaso
 Rexist Party
 Catholic Party

See also 
 Monarchy of Belgium
 Orangism (Kingdom of the Netherlands)
 Monarchism
 Belgian nationalism

References 

Monarchism in Belgium